The Crown Pastoral Land Act is an Act of Parliament in New Zealand.

The Act provides for the process of tenure review of leasehold land holdings in the high country of the South Island.

See also
List of Statutes of New Zealand (1800-1980)
List of Statutes of New Zealand (1980-present)
Agriculture in New Zealand
Station (New Zealand agriculture)

External links
Crown Pastoral Land Act 1998 - text of the Act

Statutes of New Zealand
Agriculture in New Zealand
1998 in New Zealand law